Freehold, New Jersey may refer to:
 Freehold Borough, New Jersey, the county seat of Monmouth County 
 Freehold Township, New Jersey, the much larger township that surrounds the borough

sv:Freehold, New Jersey